Chrishon Rose (born March 13, 1991) is an American football defensive tackle who is currently a free agent. He played college football at East Carolina University. He was signed by the Minnesota Vikings as a rookie free agent following the 2015 NFL Draft.

Early years
Rose attended Bishop McNamara High School in Forestville, Maryland, where he played for Coach Bryce Bevill, recognized by sports website DCSportsFan.com's Coach of the Year. He was part of a defense that shut out three opponents during the 2009 season. He was a second-team All-Washington Catholic Athletic Conference selection as a senior following an honorable mention nod as a junior. As a senior, he logged 32 tackles, 10 coming behind the line of scrimmage, helping lead the Mustangs to an 8-3 record and a league playoff berth, earning an honorable mention Big School All-State for his efforts. He was also named to the Star-Gazette second-team as a senior. Following his senior season, he played for the Washington squad in the Maryland Crab Bowl, the state's only high school all-star game, and was credited with five tackles.

Rose also competed in wrestling for Bishop McNamara, finishing eighth in the state and third in the conference (in heavyweight division). He also earned an additional two letters in basketball.

College career
Rose played for the ECU Pirates football team from 2010 to 2014. A four-year letter winner, Rose played in 48 total games for the Pirates. He booked multiple tackles in 16 of 35 contests and was considered a vital member of a defensive unit that has held 11 opponents to 100 or less rushing yards over the last three seasons.

He received honorable mention All-Conference USA recognition following the 2013 season when he logged 31 tackles and 2.5 sacks.

As a senior, he played in 13 games during the 2014 campaign, posting 41 total tackles, including 14 solo stops.

Professional career

Rose went undrafted in the 2015 NFL Draft. On June 9, 2015, the Minnesota Vikings signed Rose as a rookie free agent to fill out the 90-man roster.

Personal life
The Washington, D.C. native earned a bachelor's degree in business management during ECU's Spring Commencement Exercises in May 2014. In addition to football, Rose is also a musician, and a member of Washington, D.C. band Xtreme Intentionz (XIB).

References

External links
East Carolina Pirates bio

1991 births
Living people
Sportspeople from Alexandria, Virginia
Players of American football from Virginia
American football defensive tackles
East Carolina Pirates football players
Minnesota Vikings players